Logan Shane Allen (born May 23, 1997) is an American professional baseball pitcher in the Colorado Rockies organization. He previously played for the San Diego Padres, Cleveland Indians/Guardians and the Baltimore Orioles.

Early life
Allen was born in Palm Beach, Florida, and raised in Fletcher, North Carolina. He is the second of three sons. He studied at the IMG Academy in Bradenton, Florida, to develop his talent for baseball.

Career

Boston Red Sox
Allen was drafted by the Boston Red Sox in the eighth round of the 2015 Major League Baseball draft out of IMG Academy. He signed with the Red Sox and spent the majority of his first professional season with the Gulf Coast Red Sox, pitching to a 0.90 ERA in twenty innings, along with pitching one game for the Lowell Spinners in which he gave up one earned run in 4.1 innings.

San Diego Padres
On November 13, 2015, Allen, along with Manuel Margot, Javier Guerra and Carlos Asuaje, were traded to the San Diego Padres for Craig Kimbrel. The Padres assigned him to the Fort Wayne TinCaps, where he spent the whole season, posting a 3–4 record and 3.33 ERA in only 15 games (11 starts) due to spending time on the disabled list with an injury. He spent 2017 with both Fort Wayne and the Lake Elsinore Storm, pitching to a combined 7–9 record and 2.95 ERA with 142 strikeouts in 125 total innings pitched (24 games, with 23 being starts) between both teams, and 2018 with the San Antonio Missions and the El Paso Chihuahuas, going 14–6 with a 2.54 ERA in 25 games (24 starts) and was named Texas League Pitcher of the Year. He returned to El Paso to begin 2019.

Allen was called up and made his major league debut at Petco Park on June 18, 2019. He pitched seven shutout innings for the win against the Milwaukee Brewers, with five strikeouts and two walks, and also had his first major league hit, later scoring on an error. He was 2–3 in 8 games (4 starts) for the Padres.

Cleveland Indians / Guardians
On July 31, 2019, the Padres traded Allen to the Cleveland Indians in a three-team trade, where the Reds acquired Trevor Bauer, the Indians also acquired Yasiel Puig, Scott Moss, Franmil Reyes, and Victor Nova, and the Padres acquired Taylor Trammell.

In 2020, Allen appeared in 3 games, compiling a 0–0 record with 3.38 ERA and 7 strikeouts in 10.2 innings pitched.

In 2021, Allen beat out fellow pitcher Cal Quantrill for a starting pitcher position on the Indians' Opening Day roster after allowing only 1 run across 14 Spring Training innings. However, Allen struggled with command over the regular season and was optioned to Triple-A affiliate Columbus Clippers for the majority of May through August. He finished the season pitching to a 2–7 record with a 6.26 ERA over 50.1 innings pitched.

Allen was designated for assignment by the Guardians on May 1, 2022.

Baltimore Orioles
Allen was claimed off waivers by the Baltimore Orioles on May 5, 2022. He was designated for assignment on May 17, 2022. He cleared waivers and was outrighted to Triple-A Norfolk Tides on May 20, 2022. He was released on August 22, 2022.

Colorado Rockies
On August 26, 2022, Allen signed a minor league deal with the Colorado Rockies.

References

External links

1997 births
Living people
Sportspeople from West Palm Beach, Florida
Baseball players from Florida
Major League Baseball pitchers
San Diego Padres players
Cleveland Indians players
Cleveland Guardians players
Baltimore Orioles players
Gulf Coast Red Sox players
Lowell Spinners players
Arizona League Padres players
Tri-City Dust Devils players
Fort Wayne TinCaps players
Lake Elsinore Storm players
San Antonio Missions players
El Paso Chihuahuas players
Columbus Clippers players
Norfolk Tides players
IMG Academy alumni